This is a list of seasons completed by the Oklahoma Wranglers. The Oklahoma Wranglers were a professional arena football franchise of the Arena Football League (AFL), based in Oklahoma City, Oklahoma. The team was established in 1995 as the Memphis Pharaohs. The Pharaohs made the playoffs in their first season, but lost their quarterfinal game. Following a winless season, the franchise relocated to Portland, Oregon before the 1997 season, and changed their name to the Forest Dragons. While in Portland, the team did not have a winning record, and after three seasons, moved again to what would be their final home in Oklahoma City, becoming the Wranglers. The Wranglers made the playoffs in their first season, in 2000, but lost in the quarterfinal round. The Wranglers were disbanded after the 2001. They played their home games at Cox Convention Center.

References
General
 
 
 

Arena Football League seasons by team
Oklahoma Wranglers seasons
Oklahoma sports-related lists
Portland, Oregon-related lists
Oregon sports-related lists
Tennessee sports-related lists